, also known as  and  , was the 12th legendary Emperor of Japan, according to the traditional order of succession. Both the Kojiki, and the Nihon Shoki (collectively known as the Kiki) record events that took place during Keikō's alleged lifetime. Keikō was recorded as being an exceptionally tall emperor who had a very large family. During his reign he sought to expand territorial control through conquest of local tribes. He had a very important son named "Prince Ōsu" (Yamato Takeru), who was in possession of the Kusanagi when he died. This treasure was later moved to Atsuta Shrine, and is now a part of the Imperial Regalia of Japan. There is a possibility that Keikō actually lived or reigned in the 4th century AD rather than the 1st, but more information is needed to confirm this view.

Keikō's reign is conventionally considered to have been from 71 to 130 AD. During his alleged lifetime, he fathered at least 80 children with two chief wives (empress) and nine consorts. One of his sons became the next emperor upon his death in 130 AD, but the location of Keikō's grave (if any) is unknown. Keikō is traditionally venerated at a memorial Shinto tomb (misasagi) at Nara.

Legendary narrative
The Japanese have traditionally accepted this sovereign's historical existence, and a mausoleum (misasagi) for Keiko is currently maintained. These chronicles include legends and myths, as well as potential historical facts that have since been exaggerated and/or distorted over time. The records state that Keikō was born sometime in 13 BC, and was given the name "Otarashihiko-no-mikoto". He was the 3rd son of Emperor Suinin, and his second empress wife "Hibasu-hime". Otarashihiko-no-mikoto was allegedly chosen as crown prince over his elder brother based on a casual question on what they both had wished for. In the former's case he said "The Empire" while his elder brother said "Bow and arrows". Otarashihiko-no-mikoto later ascended to the throne in 71 AD, coming a year after his father's death.

Accounts in the Kojiki and Nihon Shoki are split when it comes to initial territorial expansion during Emperor Keikō's reign. In the Kojiki, the Emperor is said to have sent his son "Prince Ōsu" (Yamato Takeru) to Kyūshū to conquer local tribes. Alternatively, the Nihon Shoki records that he went there himself and won battles against local tribes. Both sources agree that Keikō later sent Yamato Takeru to Izumo Province, and eastern provinces to conquer the area and spread his territory. The possessions of the dead prince were gathered together along with the sword Kusanagi; and his widow venerated his memory in a shrine at her home. Sometime later, these relics and the sacred sword were moved to the current location of the Atsuta Shrine.

This claim would put him into the category of Gigantism if verified, although as with other aspects it was more than likely exaggerated. Other than Yamato Takeru, at least three of Keikō's children were ancestors of notable clans. According to tradition, emperor Keikō died in 130 AD at the age of 143, and his son Prince Wakatarashihiko was enthroned as the next emperor the following year.

Known information
Emperor Keikō is regarded by historians as a "legendary Emperor" as there is insufficient material available for further verification and study. The name Keikō-tennō was assigned to him posthumously by later generations. His name might have been regularized centuries after the lifetime ascribed to Keikō, possibly during the time in which legends about the origins of the Yamato dynasty were compiled as the chronicles known today as the Kojiki. There is a possibility that Keikō's era was in the 4th century AD rather than the 1st. This period is concurrent with the Kentoshi having an audience with the Tang Emperor, more evidence is needed though to make any conclusions. Like his father before him, Keikō is also known to have an exaggerated lifespan which is unlikely to be factual. The consecutive reigns of the emperors began to be compiled in the 8th century, and it is thought that age gaps were "filled up" as many lacunae were present. For comparison, verified ages in the 110s have since been documented and recorded as the "oldest in the world".

While the actual site of Keikō's grave is not known, the Emperor is traditionally venerated at a memorial Shinto shrine (misasagi) at Nara. The Imperial Household Agency designates this location as Keikō's mausoleum, and is formally named Yamanobe no michi no e no misasagi. Outside of the Kiki, the reign of Emperor Kinmei ( – 571 AD) is the first for which contemporary historiography has been able to assign verifiable dates. The conventionally accepted names and dates of the early Emperors were not confirmed as "traditional" though, until the reign of Emperor Kanmu between 737 and 806 AD.

Consorts and children 
Emperor Keikō allegedly had a very large family which consisted of 2 wives, 9 concubines, and more than 80 children (51 of which are listed here). It is now questionable and open to debate though, if these numbers are genuine or not. Some of his listed children might actually be duplicates of the same person. The size of Keikō's family also could have been exaggerated over time through legends and word of mouth stories.

Spouse

Concubines

Issue

See also
 List of Emperors of Japan
 Imperial cult
 Takahashi Ujibumi

Notes

References

Further reading
 Aston, William George. (1896).  Nihongi: Chronicles of Japan from the Earliest Times to A.D. 697. London: Kegan Paul, Trench, Trubner.  
 Brown, Delmer M. and Ichirō Ishida, eds. (1979).  Gukanshō: The Future and the Past. Berkeley: University of California Press. ;  
 Chamberlain, Basil Hall. (1920). The Kojiki. Read before the Asiatic Society of Japan on April 12, May 10, and June 21, 1882; reprinted, May, 1919.  
 Ponsonby-Fane, Richard Arthur Brabazon. (1959).  The Imperial House of Japan. Kyoto: Ponsonby Memorial Society. 
 __. (1953).  Studies in Shinto and Shrines. Kyoto: Ponsonby Memorial Society. 
 Titsingh, Isaac. (1834). Nihon Ōdai Ichiran; ou,  Annales des empereurs du Japon. Paris: Royal Asiatic Society, Oriental Translation Fund of Great Britain and Ireland.  
 Varley, H. Paul. (1980).  Jinnō Shōtōki: A Chronicle of Gods and Sovereigns. New York: Columbia University Press. ;  

 
 

Legendary Emperors of Japan
People of Yayoi-period Japan
1st-century monarchs in Asia
2nd-century monarchs in Asia
1st-century Japanese monarchs
2nd-century Japanese monarchs
Japanese giants